Şişcani may refer to several places:

 Şişcani, a village in Hoceni Commune, Vaslui County, Romania
 Şişcani, a district in the city of Adjud, Vrancea County, Romania
 Şişcani, a commune in Raionul Nisporeni, Moldova
 Sišćani, a village in Bjelovar-Bilogora County, Croatia